James Desmond Corcoran AO (8 November 1928 – 3 January 2004) was an Australian politician, representing the South Australian Branch of the Australian Labor Party. He was the 37th Premier of South Australia, serving between 15 February 1979 and 18 September 1979. He also served as the 1st Deputy Premier of South Australia in 1968 and again from 1970 to 1979.

Early life

Born in Millicent, South Australia, Corcoran joined the Labor Party in 1941. He enlisted in the Australian Army and fought in the Korean War (where he was mentioned in dispatches), as well as serving in Japan, Malaya and New Guinea.

Politics

Corcoran left the Army in 1961 and in 1962 was elected to the South Australian House of Assembly, succeeding his father, Jim Corcoran, as the member for Millicent. Corcoran quickly impressed many within the Labor Party with his vigorous approach and his talent for administration. When the ALP won government in South Australia in 1965 for the first time in 32 years, Corcoran became Minister of Irrigation, Minister of Lands, and Minister of Repatriation. The new Premier, Frank Walsh, made Corcoran his chief political confidant. Like Walsh, Corcoran was a firm anti-communist and a devout Catholic. In fact, Walsh wanted Corcoran to be his successor, hoping thereby to foil the ambitions of Deputy Leader Don Dunstan, whom Walsh resented and distrusted.

Following the septuagenarian Walsh's retirement in 1967, Corcoran challenged Dunstan for the ALP leadership, but lost by three votes. As a concession to Corcoran, Dunstan named him Deputy Leader, and created the post of Deputy Premier of South Australia for him as well. In Dunstan's 1967-68 Cabinet, Corcoran dropped the Repatriation portfolio in favor of Immigration.

Labor lost its majority at the 1968 election, mainly due to losing two marginal rural seats. Corcoran himself was nearly defeated in his own seat, winning by just one vote over his LCL rival Martin Cameron.  Cameron protested and a by-election was held later that year, with Corcoran winning more comfortably, leaving the new Steele Hall LCL government to rely on the casting vote of Independent Speaker Tom Stott.

Following the election, Corcoran became Deputy Opposition Leader under Dunstan; and upon Labor's victory at the 1970 election, he returned to the Deputy Premiership. He also served as Minister of Public Works and Minister of Marine and Harbours.

Over the next nine years, Dunstan and Corcoran made an unconventional but functional team. Corcoran privately opposed many of the social reforms Dunstan was implementing, such as liberalised abortion and homosexuality laws. In addition, Corcoran disliked Dunstan's glamorous image and fondness for the arts. A conservative dresser, Corcoran did not at all share Dunstan's enthusiasm for wearing casual clothes on public occasions. Nevertheless, the two men felt a wary respect for one another and managed to maintain a working relationship. Behind the scenes, Dunstan sometimes found Corcoran's plain-speaking style useful, in order to control others within the ALP. Meanwhile, Dunstan remained the public face of the Labor government over the next decade.

When Corcoran's majority in Millicent was redistributed away ahead of the 1975 election, Corcoran transferred to the Adelaide-area seat of Coles. However, when a redistribution made that seat, in turn, unwinnable before the 1977 election, Corcoran transferred to nearby Hartley.

By early 1979, Dunstan's health had deteriorated to the point that he could not continue in office, and he resigned on 15 February. Corcoran was elected his successor, thus finally achieving his dream of becoming Premier. He also served as Treasurer and Minister for Ethnic Affairs. Spurred by positive opinion polls, Corcoran called a snap election two years before it was due (without pre-informing the party apparatus) in the hope that he would gain a mandate of his own. The election campaign was plagued by problems; the state's main newspaper, The Advertiser, openly favored the Liberal campaign.

At the election, Labor suffered an 8% swing against it and lost to the Liberals under David Tonkin. After the election, Corcoran soon resigned from the Labor leadership and was succeeded by the much younger John Bannon, whose urbane style and academic background brought him a lot closer to Dunstan than to Corcoran. In 1982, Bannon easily defeated Tonkin and led Labor back into government. Corcoran did not run in that election.

Death
Corcoran died in 2004, aged 75, and was survived by his wife, Carmel, their eight children and twelve grandchildren.

References 
 Doherty, E., Heggen, B. & Pippos, C. "Former premier Corcoran dies", Sunday Mail, p 2, 4 January 2004.
 Jory, R. "SA premier put his own mark on office",  The Courier-Mail, p. 22, 2 February 2004.
 Kelton, G. "Pragmatic man of the people not forgotten", The Advertiser, p. 18, 5 January 2004.

External links 
 
 

|-

|-

|-

|-

|-

|-

|-

|-

Australian Labor Party members of the Parliament of South Australia
Premiers of South Australia
Deputy Premiers of South Australia
Treasurers of South Australia
Officers of the Order of Australia
People from Millicent, South Australia
20th-century Australian politicians
1928 births
2004 deaths
Deaths from cancer in South Australia
Australian military personnel of the Korean War